Redline Racer (Suzuki Alstare Extreme Racing for the European and North American Dreamcast release, European Game Boy Color release and Microsoft Windows re-release) is a racing game that was developed by Criterion Games and published by Ubi Soft.

Gameplay
The player controls a motorcycle racer and starts every race from the last position. There are three tracks and three bikes to choose from at first, with more becoming available (10 tracks and 8 bikes in total) as the player wins the races on each of the tracks. The player can also choose the team that the racer belongs to, as well as the racer's sex. All the tracks are set in different environments: a canyon, a tropical island without a highway, an area full of orchards, etc. A race lasts for three laps.

Development
The game was first mentioned in January 1998.

Reception

Redline Racer

The game received "average" reviews according to the review aggregation website GameRankings. Next Generation called it "just another average racing game with which to pass the time. It is a shame because Redline Racer does look really good."

Suzuki Alstare Extreme Racing

The PC version of Suzuki Alstare Extreme Racing received "mixed" reviews according to the review aggregation website Metacritic. Jeff Lundrigan of NextGen said that the Dreamcast version "has the Suzuki team license (obviously) and some fairly decent graphics, but that's about it. In fact, on the whole, it's about as generic as they come." In Japan, where the same Dreamcast version was released first under the name  on 29 April 1999, Famitsu gave it a score of 26 out of 40.

See also
Suzuki TT Superbikes

Notes

References

External links
 
 

1998 video games
Criterion Games games
Dreamcast games
Game Boy Color games
Motorcycle video games
Racing video games
Ubisoft games
Windows games
Video games developed in the United Kingdom
Multiplayer and single-player video games